Ibrahim Dakkak (1929-2016) was a Palestinian civil engineer and activist.

Early life
Dakkak completed his secondary education in Palestine and graduated from the American University in Cairo with degrees in science and mathematics in 1947. He worked as a teacher in Kuwait, from which he was expelled with a number of political activists. In 1959, he moved to Istanbul University (Robert College) to study civil engineering.

Career
Dakkak supervised the construction of Tira College for Girls in the city of Ramallah and the Jordanian Shobak School. He was placed in charge of reconstruction of the al-Aqsa Mosque after it burned in 1969.

A prominent leader of the Palestinian national movement after Israel's occupation of Palestinian territories in 1967, he  cofounded the Palestinian National Liberation Front, which was active until 1972. He served as secretary of the Palestinian National Steering Committee in the occupied territories, which included mayors and a spectra of the Palestinian national movement, which arose in the wake of the Camp David Accords between Israel and Egypt.

Dakkak headed the Engineers Association in the West Bank for 19 years, from 1978 until 1986. He contributed to the formation of a number of leading Palestinian civil society organizations such as the Higher Council of Education and the Arab Thought Forum, which he chaired from 1978 to 1992.

In 2002, he worked on the launch of the Palestinian National Initiative with Dr. Mustafa Barghouti and Haidar Abdel-Shafi.
He chaired the Board of Trustees of Birzeit University in 2005.

References

1929 births
Palestinian National Liberation Front politicians
2016 deaths
The American University in Cairo alumni
Palestinian expatriates in Kuwait
Robert College alumni
Palestinian expatriates in Turkey